Rasuwillka (Quechua, Hispanicized spellings Rasohuilca, Rasuvilca, Razohuilca, Razuhuilca, Razuhuillca, Razuwillka, Rasu Bilca, Rasu Willca, Razu Bilca) is a mountain in the Andes of Peru, about  high. It is situated in the Ayacucho Region, Huanta Province, Huanta District, and in the La Mar Province, Tambo District. Rasuwillka lies north of the lakes Muruqucha, Pampaqucha, and Yanaqucha and northeast of Chakaqucha.

By the local peasants Rasuwillka is venerated as an apu.

References

Mountains of Peru
Mountains of Ayacucho Region